The Teliu is a right tributary of the river Tărlung in Romania. It flows into the Tărlung near the village Teliu.

References

Rivers of Romania
Rivers of Brașov County